Louis-Marie de Jonghe d'Ardoye (born 7 March 1888, date of death unknown) was a Belgian equestrian. He competed in two events at the 1928 Summer Olympics.

References

1888 births
Year of death missing
Belgian male equestrians
Olympic equestrians of Belgium
Equestrians at the 1928 Summer Olympics
Place of birth missing